Androstanedione, also known as 5α-androstanedione or as 5α-androstane-3,17-dione, is a naturally occurring androstane (5α-androstane) steroid and an endogenous metabolite of androgens like testosterone, dihydrotestosterone (DHT), dehydroepiandrosterone (DHEA), and androstenedione. It is the C5 epimer of etiocholanedione (5β-androstanedione). Androstanedione is formed from androstenedione by 5α-reductase and from DHT by 17β-hydroxysteroid dehydrogenase. It has some androgenic activity.

In female genital skin, the conversion of androstenedione into DHT through 5α-androstanedione appears to be more important than the direct conversion of testosterone into DHT.

References

External links
 Androstanedione (HMDB0000899) - Human Metabolome Database

5α-Reduced steroid metabolites
Androgens and anabolic steroids
Androstanes
Diketones
Steroid hormones